William Edward Merritt (18 August 1908 – 9 June 1977) was a New Zealand Test cricketer who played for Canterbury and Northamptonshire, and a rugby league footballer who played for Canterbury, Wigan and Halifax.

Career in New Zealand
Merritt was born in the Christchurch seaside suburb of Sumner and attended Christchurch Boys' High School. A leg break and googly bowler and a forceful lower order batsman, he had played just four first-class matches when he was selected for the New Zealand tour to England in 1927 – in one of the four, he had taken eight Otago wickets for 68 runs in an innings. The 1927 tour, though no Test matches were played, was a triumph: Merritt took 107 wickets and Wisden noted that though "he showed no great command of length... on certain days – and these were fairly frequent – he had the best of batsmen in trouble".

Merritt was a certain selection when New Zealand were elevated to Test status with the MCC tour of 1929–30, but failed to live up to expectations. In the four Tests, he took just eight wickets and, though he bowled more than any other New Zealand player, his bowling was hit for more than 3.6 runs an over, a high scoring rate for those days. Returning to England on the 1931 tour, he took 99 first-class wickets, but failed in the Tests and was dropped for the final Test at Manchester, which was in any case ruined by rain. Wisden noted that "he had his great days but in many matches bowled the bad ball far too often". Problems with maintaining a length were compounded by a tendency to over-bowl the googly at the expense of the more effective leg-break. His greatest moment on the tour came against the MCC at Lord's, when he bowled throughout the second innings to take 7 for 28 and dismiss the MCC for 48, giving the New Zealanders an innings victory.

Career in England
At the end of the 1931 tour, Merritt stayed in England to play League cricket for the Rishton Cricket Club in Manchester, in breach of his New Zealand Cricket Council agreement not to play in England for at least two years; he took over 1000 League Cricket wickets, also scoring more than 7000 runs. After 2 seasons at Rishton he played for East Lancashire and continued to play in the League after the war. Merritt: "My decision to come to England was dictated by business reasons, and when it is realised that some members of the New Zealand team are without employment at all, I do not think I can be blamed". He played only three more seasons in New Zealand. In 1935–36, his last season at home, he coached Canterbury and took 31 wickets in the Plunket Shield, which remained the record for several years. That season, in his last match in New Zealand, he took 13 wickets for 181 against Otago.

By 1938 he had qualified by residence to play for Northamptonshire, where his New Zealand Test colleague Ken James had settled as wicket-keeper. In his one full season for the county, 1939, he scored 926 runs and took 87 wickets, though in this one English season of eight-ball overs he was conceding runs at almost five an over. He was instrumental, with 12 wickets, in enabling Northamptonshire to record their first victory in first-class cricket for almost four years, against Cambridge University, and followed that up with six wickets in an innings when, in the same month of May 1939, the team beat another county (Leicestershire) for the first time since May 1935.

Walter Hammond described one of his deliveries as "a leg-break which struck like a cobra, one of the nastiest balls I have had to deal with".

Merritt returned to Northamptonshire to play one season after the Second World War, but his appearances were restricted by a League contract to midweek games. He retired into the Leagues full-time after 1946, returning to New Zealand only in 1966, having run a successful business in Dudley, Worcestershire.

He joined the BBC commentary team for the Test Matches when New Zealand toured England in 1958 and 1969.

References

External links
 
 

1908 births
1977 deaths
Cricketers from Christchurch
People educated at Christchurch Boys' High School
Canterbury cricketers
Canterbury rugby league team players
Halifax R.L.F.C. players
New Zealand cricket commentators
New Zealand cricketers
New Zealand expatriate rugby league players
New Zealand expatriate sportspeople in England
New Zealand rugby league players
New Zealand Test cricketers
Pre-1930 New Zealand representative cricketers
Northamptonshire cricketers
Wigan Warriors players